Josie and the Pussycats is a 2001 satirical musical comedy film co-produced by Universal Pictures and Metro-Goldwyn-Mayer. Directed and co-written by Harry Elfont and Deborah Kaplan, the film is based on the Archie Comics series and the Hanna-Barbera cartoon of the same name. Filmed entirely in Vancouver, Canada, the film features Rachael Leigh Cook, Tara Reid, and Rosario Dawson as the Pussycats, with Alan Cumming, Parker Posey, Gabriel Mann, Paulo Costanzo, and Missi Pyle in supporting roles. The film received mixed reviews and was a commercial failure upon its initial release, but has enjoyed later success as a cult film.

Plot
Wyatt Frame, an executive with the pop music record label MegaRecords, is confronted on a private jet by successful boy band DuJour over a strange backing track they have discovered on their recent single. Wyatt and the plane's pilot parachute out of the jet, leaving it to crash with the band still on board, ensuring their deaths.

Landing outside of the town of Riverdale, Wyatt begins searching for a replacement band for DuJour, eventually discovering struggling local rock band The Pussycats: lead vocalist and guitarist Josie McCoy, drummer Melody Valentine, and bassist Valerie Brown. The group accepts Wyatt's immediate offer of a major record deal despite its seeming implausibility, and they are flown to New York City with their manager Alexander, his sister Alexandra, and Josie's friend Alan M. Wyatt renames the band "Josie and the Pussycats" without their permission. Meanwhile, MegaRecords CEO Fiona, in a meeting with world government representatives, details how the United States government has conspired with the music industry to hide subliminal messages in pop music to brainwash teenagers into buying consumer products. Musicians who discover the hidden messages in their music are made to disappear via staged plane crashes, drug overdoses and similar disasters.

The band's first single is released and, due to subliminal messaging, instantly becomes successful. Valerie begins to resent the attention the label gives Josie, while Melody's uncanny behavioral perception makes her suspicious of Fiona. Fiona orders Wyatt to kill the pair before they uncover the conspiracy; they are sent to a fake appearance on Total Request Live where two fake Carson Dalys attempt to kill them, though the band survives due to their incompetence. Wyatt gives Josie a copy of the group's latest single, which contains a subliminal message track designed to brainwash her into desiring a solo career. After arguing with her bandmates, Josie realizes that the single caused the fight. Her suspicions are confirmed when she uses a mixing board to make the subliminal track audible. However, Fiona catches her unawares.

MegaRecords have organized a giant pay-per-view concert that will be streamed online, wherein they plan to unleash a major subliminal message via themed cat ears headsets that viewers must buy to hear the audio. Fiona and Wyatt plan for Josie to perform solo, but when the band insists on performing together, the pair threaten to kill Melody and Valerie in a staged car explosion if they do not comply. However, the badly injured members of DuJour arrive and thwart the pair's plan, having survived the plane crash by landing the plane in the middle of a Metallica concert, where they were assaulted by fans.

Josie, Valerie and Melody fight Fiona, Wyatt and their security guards. During the tussle, Fiona accidentally destroys the machine used to generate the messages, revealing the new subliminal message to be one that would make Fiona universally popular. Fiona reveals that her lisp made her a social outcast in high school, while Wyatt reveals that his appearance is a disguise—he went to the same high school as Fiona, but was a persecuted and unpopular albino; the two immediately bond. The government agents colluding with Fiona arrive, but with the conspiracy exposed, they arrest the pair as scapegoats to cover up their involvement in the scheme. They abandon the idea of spreading subliminal messages via music, deciding that movies are more effective.

Josie, Valerie, and Melody perform the concert together. Alan M arrives and confesses his love for Josie, who returns his feelings. The concert audience removes their headsets at Josie's suggestion and, able to judge the band on its own merits for the first time, roar their approval.

Cast
 Rachael Leigh Cook as Josie McCoy, the Pussycats' main songwriter, lead singer and guitarist
 Tara Reid as Melody Valentine, the Pussycats' absent-minded blonde drummer and backup singer
 Rosario Dawson as Valerie Brown, the Pussycats' strong-willed and perceptive bassist and backup singer
 Gabriel Mann as Alan M. Mayberry, a folk guitarist and Josie's romantic interest
 Paulo Costanzo as Alexander Cabot, the band's flamboyant and snobby manager
 Missi Pyle as Alexandra Cabot, Alexander's talentless twin sister
 Alan Cumming as Wyatt Frame, a manipulative promoter who recruits and manages young bands for MegaRecords
 Parker Posey as Fiona, MegaRecords CEO who uses subliminal messages to manipulate teens' spending
 Tom Butler as Agent Kelly, the government agent who collaborates with Wyatt and Fiona in the scheme
 Donald Faison as D.J., of Du Jour
 Seth Green as Travis, of Du Jour
 Breckin Meyer as Marco, of Du Jour
 Alexander Martin as Les, of Du Jour 
 Serena Altschul as herself
 Carson Daly as himself
 Aries Spears as The Other Carson Daly
 Eugene Levy as himself
 Kenneth "Babyface" Edmonds as The Chief
 Russ Leatherman as Mr. Moviefone
 Harry Elfont (director cameo) as Lex, The Pilot

Johnny Depp, Gwen Stefani, Christina Aguilera, Britney Spears and Matt Damon appear as cardboard cut-outs during the TRL scene.

Production
Beyoncé, Aaliyah and Lisa "Left Eye" Lopes auditioned for the role of Valerie Brown. Elfont said that they wanted someone who knew how to do comedy, Lopes read for the part twice, she really wanted the role, Beyoncé was "quiet and shy" and Aaliyah was "serious and thoughtful".

In line with its theme of subliminal advertising, the inordinate degree of product placement in the film constitutes a running gag. Almost every scene features a mention or appearance of one or more famous brands, including Sega and the Dreamcast (Sega's mascot Sonic the Hedgehog also appears in Archie Comics), Motorola, Starbucks, Gatorade, Snapple, Evian, Target, Aquafina, America Online, Pizza Hut, Cartoon Network (which has aired the cartoon series on many occasions), Revlon, Kodak, Puma, Advil, Bounce, and more. None of the advertising was paid promotion by the represented brands; it was inserted voluntarily by the filmmakers.

Cook later expressed surprise as her casting: "somehow, they gave one of the title roles to me, and I cannot sing at all. I don't play guitar. I have no idea." Cook said the producers considered her for the titular lead in Josie having remembered Cook from her audition for the lead role in Can't Hardly Wait (both films were co-written and directed by Kaplan and Elfont).

Media

Home media
Josie and the Pussycats was released on VHS and DVD by Universal Studios Home Video on August 21, 2001. The film's theatrical PG-13 rating from the MPAA in the United States caused some contention with licenser Archie Comics, and a "Family-Friendly" PG-rated version was released alongside the theatrical version on home media in the Fullscreen (1.33:1) format. This version omitted a great deal of profanity and sexual references. The theatrical version was presented in the Widescreen (1.85:1) format.

The movie was released on home media internationally by MGM Home Entertainment (through 20th Century Fox Home Entertainment) on December 17, 2001.

To coincide with the film's 20th Anniversary, the Blu-ray version was released for the first time through Mill Creek Entertainment on September 21, 2021 with most of the extras from the DVD release carried over.

Soundtrack

Released by Sony Music Soundtrax and Playtone Records on March 27, 2001, Music from the Motion Picture Josie and the Pussycats was well-received, certifying a gold album with 500,000 copies despite the film's critical and commercial failure. Cook's singing voice was provided by Kay Hanley of the band Letters to Cleo, while backing vocals were provided by Cook, Reid, Dawson, and Bif Naked.

The soundtrack was reissued on vinyl by Mondo in 2017.

Reception

Initial reception

The film grossed $14,866,015 at the U.S. box office, less than its production budget, an estimated $22–39 million, resulting in a domestic box office bomb.

The film received mixed reviews. Based on the Hanna-Barbera series of the 70s, critics felt it (and other movies like it based on cartoons) did not work on screen. On Rotten Tomatoes the film has an approval rating of 53% based on reviews from 123 critics. The site's consensus states: "This live-action update of Josie and the Pussycats offers up bubbly, fluffy fun, but the constant appearance of product placements seems rather hypocritical." On Metacritic, the film scores a 47 out of 100, based on 29 critics, indicating "mixed or average reviews". Audiences surveyed by CinemaScore gave the film a grade B on scale of A to F.

Roger Ebert gave the film one-half of a star out of a possible four, commenting that "Josie and the Pussycats are not dumber than the Spice Girls, but they're as dumb as the Spice Girls, which is dumb enough", in an obvious comparison with the British girl group's 1997 feature film, Spice World, which was met with negative reviews, and to which Ebert had given the same score.

Cult status
In the years subsequent to its initial release, Josie and the Pussycats has been reappraised by critics, and has found success as a cult film. The film has been praised for its satirical take on American pop culture, and for its prescience in satirizing product placement and the corporatization of the music industry. Evaluating the film for The A.V. Club in 2009, Nathan Rabin writes that it is "funny, sly and sweet" and "a sly, sustained spoof of consumerism". He rates the film as a "secret success". The Los Angeles Times wrote in 2017 that the film's "sharply satirical vision of the hyper-commercial record industry feels only more relevant."

To commemorate the vinyl reissue of the soundtrack in 2017, Josie and the Pussycats was screened by Alamo Drafthouse at the Ace Hotel in Los Angeles, with a performance by Hanley and a panel with Cook, Reid, and Dawson, and received an oral history feature in The Fader.

DuJour appears in the 2021 Robot Chicken special "The Bleepin' Robot Chicken Archie Comics Special". Green, Meyer and Faison reprise their roles, and Cook reprises her role of Josie.

Scrapped TV series
A month before this film was released, DiC Entertainment, an animation studio with extensive ties to Archie Comics, announced it had bought the rights to create a cartoon featuring the characters, and was planning to release it in the wake of this film. However, these plans were scrapped. Likewise, not much about this cartoon is known.

References

External links
 
 
 
 
 
 

Josie and the Pussycats
2001 films
2001 comedy films
2000s female buddy films
2000s English-language films
2000s musical comedy films
2000s satirical films
2000s teen comedy films
20th Century Fox films
American female buddy films
American musical comedy films
American satirical films
American teen comedy films
American teen musical films
Canadian musical comedy films
Canadian satirical films
Canadian teen comedy films
English-language Canadian films
Films about consumerism
Films about girl groups
Films based on Archie Comics
Films directed by Deborah Kaplan
Films directed by Harry Elfont
Films produced by Marc E. Platt
Films scored by John Frizzell (composer)
Films set in New York City
Films shot in Vancouver
Live-action films based on animated series
Live-action films based on comics
Metro-Goldwyn-Mayer films
Universal Pictures films
2000s American films
2000s Canadian films